Turkey women's national goalball team results is a list of the results for the Turkey women's national goalball team in official competitions excluding friendly matches.

2003-2009

2003
The team competed in the 2003 IBSA World Games from 1 to 10 August 2011, in Quebec City, Canada. Ten teams competed. The first stage was pool play with five teams per pool and the top two teams in each pool advancing to the next round. Turkey women's team lost all four Round-Robin matches.

2007
The team competed at the 2007 IBSA Goalball European Championships, hosted by the Turkish Blind Sports Federation, in Antalya, Turkey with 11 teams contesting the women's competition. The team finished tenth.

2009
he team competed at the 2009 European Championships, in Munich, Germany, with eleven teams taking part. The team finished the event in last place.

2010-2019

2010
The team competed in the 2010 IBSA European Championships, in July 2010, in Eskişehir, Turkey. The team finished second.

2011
The team competed in the 2011 IBSA World Games from 1 to 10 April 2011, in Antalya, Turkey, organised by the Turkish Blind Sports Federation. They placed seventh in Group Y and won five of their six games, and were third in the final standings, behind Finland and Canada.

The team competed in the 2011 IBSA European Championships, from 17 to 23 October 2011, in Assens, Denmark. They finished eighth.

2012
The team competed in the 2012 IBSA European Championships (Division B), in Ascoli Piceno, Italy.

Team member were Neşe Mercan (#1), Sümeyye Özcan (#2), Sevda Altunoluk (#3), Gülşah Aktürk (#4), Sadiye Ardıç (#5), Buket Atalay (#6).

2013
The team competed in the 2013 IBSA Goalball European Championships, Group A, from 1 to 11 November 2013, at Konya, Turkey. They came second, ahead of Israel but behind winners Russia.

2014
The team took part at the Malmö Lady- and Men InterCup 2014 held in Sweden between 29 May and 1 June. They won the bronze medal.

The team members were: Seda Yıldız (#2), Sevda Altunoluk (#3), Gülşah Aktürk (#4), Sadiye Ardıç )#5), Buket Atalay (#6) and Sümeyye Özcan (#7).

The team competed in the 2014 World Championships from 30 June to 5 July 2014, in Espoo, Finland. They were in Pool X, mercied Greece and Finland, drawing with Russia, and beating Japan 5:1 and the United States 8:2.

Athletes were Gülsah Aktürk (#4), Sevda Altunoluk (#3), Sadiye Ardic (#5), Buket Atalay (#6), Sümeyye Özcan (#7), and Seda Yıldız (#2).

2015
The team competed in the 2015 IBSA Goalball European A Championships in Kaunas, Lithuania. In Group Y, they beat Sweden 5:0 in the quarter-finals, mercied Ukraine 12:2, going on to beat Russia 5:0, to take the gold medal.

2016
The team competed in the 2016 Summer Paralympics, with competition from Thursday 8 September to finals on Friday 16 September 2016, in the temporary Future Arena, Rio de Janeiro, Brazil.

Quarter-finals

Semi-finals

Finals

2017
The team competed in the 2017 IBSA Goalball European A Championships from 15 to 23 September 2017, at Pajulahti, Nastola, Finland. Beating Finland 6:0 in the quarter-finals, defeating Greece 8:0 in the semi-finals, the team was beaten by Russia 3:6, to take the silver medal.

Athletes included Sevda Altınoluk (highest goal scorer of the tournament), and Neşe Mercan.

2018
The team competed in the 2018 World Championships from 3 to 8 June 2018, at the Baltiska Hallen, Malmö, Sweden. They placed second in Pool C, mercied the United States in the quarter-finals 12:2, and in the semi-finals, beat Brazil 5:2. They placed second, behind Russia, and ahead of Brazil.
Team members were Sevda Altınoluk, Gülşah Düzgün, Neşe Mercan, Kader Çelik , Şeydanur Kaplan and Reyhan Yılmaz.

2019
The team competed in the 2019 IBSA Goalball European A Championships from 5 to 14 October 2019, in Rostock, Germany. They ranked first in Pool Y, to defeat Israel in the finals 8:6, to take the gold medal.

Athletes included Sevda Altunoluk (highest goal scorer of the tournament), Sevtap Altunoluk, Kader Çelik, Gülşah Düzgün, Neşe Mercan, and Seda Yıldız.

2020-2029

2020

The team competed in the 2020 Summer Paralympics, with competition from Wednesday 25 August to finals on Friday 3 September 2021, in the Makuhari Messe arena, Chiba, Tokyo, Japan. They qualified by placing second at the 2018 IBSA Goalball World Championships.

Round-robin

Quarterfinal

Semifinal

Final

2021
The team competes in the 2021 IBSA Goalball European A Championships from 4 to 13 November 2021 in Samsun, Turkey. Turkey won the silver medal after losing to Russia 4–5 in the final.

Turkey team consisted of Fatma Gül Güler (#1), Reyhan Yılmaz (#2), Sevda Altunoluk (#3), Şeydanur Kaplan (#4), Sevtap Altunoluk (#7), Berfin Altan (#8) coached by Gültekin Karasu.

References

Results
goalball